The majority of church buildings in Brno belong to the Roman Catholic Church, others mainly to Protestant churches. In addition, there are a synagogue and a mosque. To describe the more notable ones, we can divide Brno into three areas: the city centre (inside the former walls), the early suburbs (from the 1850s until after World War I), and former villages and large housing estates incorporated after World War I, including post-World War II developments.

City centre

Catholic 
 Cathedral of Sts. Peter and Paul
– Petrov Hill; Gothic church rebuilt in the Baroque style during the 18th century, later partially reconstructed in the Neo-Gothic style; two characteristic towers (81 m high) dating from 1905; cathedral since 1777  
 St. Michael's Church
– Dominikánské Square; a Baroque church from the 17th century, until the Edict on Idle Institutions in the 1780s a church of the Dominican Order; later (1905 to 1950) used by the Redemptorists; some of the former monastery buildings serve as the New Town Hall (Nová radnice) of Brno
 Church of the Holy Cross
– church of the Order of Friars Minor Capuchin, a Baroque building from the 17th century; the crypt under the church is a unique air-circulation system providing natural mummification of buried bodies
 St. Mary Magdalene's Church
– a Baroque church from the 1650s, built for the Franciscans on the site of an older church that originated from a synagogue closed after expulsion of the Jews in the 15th century; the Franciscans resided here until the Edict on Idle Institutions; later the church (and adjacent monastery) belonged to the Congregation of the Blessed Sacrament (1912-1950); since 1991 it has been administered by the Congregatio Fratrum Sanctissimi Sacramenti
 St. Joseph's Church
– former Ursuline church, nowadays closed 
 St. Johns' Church with the Loreto Chapel 
– Church of Sts. John the Baptist and John the Evangelist, since the Middle Ages a part of the Franciscan monastery; the originally Gothic church was renovated in the Baroque style during the 1720s-1730s, when the Loreto Chapel with the Holy Stairs was built next to the church
 Church of the Assumption
– a Baroque church of the Jesuits, the only remnants of a Jesuit College from the 16th/17th centuries, interior partly from the 18th century 
 Church of St. James the Great
– originally the parish church of the non-Slavonic inhabitants of Brno, built from 14th to 16th centuries predominantly in the Gothic style; the spire (from 1592) is 92m high (the 7th highest building in the Czech Republic and the tallest in Brno).
 St. Thomas's Church
– a Baroque church with a monumental facade from 1665–1675 on the spot of the Gothic one damaged in the Thirty Years' War; since 1350 a part of an Augustinian monastery, planned as a burial place of Moravian rulers (Margrave Jobst is buried there); in the 1780s the Augustinians moved to Staré Brno

Protestant and Orthodox 
 Bethlehem Church
– built in the 19th century for Czech-speaking Protestants
 Comenius Church
– built in the 1860s in Neo-Gothic style for especially German-speaking Protestants (till the expulsion of Germans from Czechoslovakia after World War II)
 St. Wenceslaus (Orthodox) Church
– built in 1930–1931 at the foot of Špilberk Hill

Gallery

Former suburbs

Catholic 
 Staré Brno (Augustinian Abbey) 
– originally a Cistercian Convent, from the 1780s a monastery of Augustinians transferred from St. Thomas Church in the city centre; famous for its association with Gregor Mendel, who served as its abbot from 1868 to 1884 
 St. Leopold's Church
– a Baroque church of the Brothers Hospitallers with a hospital in the Vienna (Vídeňská) Street
 St. Augustine's Church
– finished in 1935
 Salesian church of Our Lady
– situated in Žabovřesky, Help of Christians from the 1990s 
 Holy Trinity Church (former Charterhouse)
– situated in Královo Pole, built in the 1370s as a part of Carthusian monastery (founded 1375, abolished 1782), later reconstructed in Baroque style
 Assumption of the Virgin Mary Church (former Premonstratensian Abbey)
– situated in Zábrdovice, a Baroque church from the 1660s (interior from the 18th century), a part of the former Premonstratensian monastery abolished in 1780s with St. Cunigunde Church (dedicated 1211);  it serves as a hospital
 Church of the Sacred Heart
– situated in Husovice, with Art Nouveau elements, finished 1910; since the 1990s administered by the Franciscans
 Church of St. Cyril and Methodius
– situated in Židenice, finished 1935
 Church of the Immaculate Conception
– situated in Trnitá, built in the 1910s in Art Nouveau style to replace the demolished St. Stephen Church 
 St. Giles's Church
– situated in Komárov, started in the beginning of the 12th century (the oldest church in Brno), later rebuilt

Protestant 
 Hussite Church in Botanická Street
– a functionalistic building from 1928-1929
 Hussite Church in Královo Pole
 Hussite Church in Židenice
 Evangelical Church in Židenice

The Church of Jesus Christ of Latter-day Saints 
 Meetinghouse on Sochor Street in the Žabovřesky District.

Non-Christian places of worship 
 Synagogue in the Skořepka Street
– the only remaining one of Brno' synagogues, a functionalistic building from the 1930s 
 Mosque
– in the Vienna (Vídeňská) Street; the first mosque in the Czech Republic (opened 1998), with no minaret

Gallery

Joined villages and large housing estates 
 Horní Heršpice – St. Clement Hofbauer Church
 Přízřenice – St. Margaret Church
 Starý Lískovec – St. John of Nepomuk Church
 Komín – St. Lawrence Church
 Bystrc – Church of Sts. John the Baptist and John the Apostle 
 Žebětín – St. Bartholomew Church
 Řečkovice – St. Lawrence Church
 Soběšice – Church of the Immaculate Conception
 Obřany – St. Wenceslaus Church
 Líšeň – St. Giles Church
 Slatina – Holy Cross Church
 Tuřany – Church of the Annunciation
 Tuřany – Hussite Church

Gallery

References 
 Buben, Milan, Encyklopedie řádů, kongregací a řeholních společností katolické církve v českých zemích, II. díl/1. svazek, III. díl/1. svazek, Libri, Prague (2003 and 2006).
 Biskupství brněnské, Brno (2000). 
 Encyclopaedia of history of City of Brno
 Brno City website
 Orthodox Church community of Brno
 Jewish Community of Brno - relics
 Roman Catholic Bishopric of Brno
 History of Husovice